Gioacchino "Jake" Amari (March 14, 1945 – June 14, 1997) was an Italian-American mobster who served as acting underboss and later acting boss of the DeCavalcante crime family of New Jersey.

Criminal career 
According to the testimony provided by Vincent "Vinny Ocean" Palermo, the later acting boss of the DeCavalcante crime family, Amari was a prominent and ruthless captain before being promoted to the acting underboss after the imprisonment of longtime family boss, Giovanni "John the Eagle" Riggi, who had been put on trial for racketeering and extortion charges after developing a great influence inside most of the unions in New Jersey together with Amari. Amari was reportedly a powerful labor racketeer of Newark, New Jersey during the 1980s, and was almost charged with Riggi in extorting the unions into ripping off their welfare and pension funds in the early 1990s.

Family underboss 
After reputed captain John "Johnny Boy" D'Amato stepped up as acting boss for Riggi in 1991, Amari developed a great partnership with reputed consigliere Stefano "Steve the Truck Driver" Vitabile, who was also one of the most powerful figures in the DeCavalcante crime family at the time. After longtime member and former underboss Louis LaRasso disappeared in the summer of 1991, Amari was reportedly promoted to acting underboss and fully in charge of all labor and construction racketeering operations, as well as AMI Construction, from Elizabeth, New Jersey.

Promotion 
While serving as a "consultant" for Local 394 in the "International Association of Laborers and Hod Carriers", Amari would soon be promoted again, as then-current acting boss John D'Amato was recruited by Gambino crime family boss John Gotti into taking over the DeCavalcante crime family, and put Riggi aside. However, after an alleged fight with his girlfriend, rumors started going around that D'Amato was homosexual, and as Anthony Capo heard this, he shared it with current administration members Amari and Stefano Vitabile, who quickly acted on prior knowledge and decided to have D'Amato murdered while informing the incarcerated Riggi. In 1992, D'Amato was shot to death in his car, as Amari believed it would have been an embarrassment if a homosexual represented their family in Cosa Nostra. His body was never recovered. It was around this time that Amari was promoted within the organization and placed as acting boss of the DeCavalcante crime family in 1992.

Sitdown with New York 
During the mid-1990s, Amari and Vitabile, now the most powerful members of the family, were present in a sitdown with representatives of the Gambino and Colombo crime families in New York City, as the DeCavalcante crime family had been recruiting reputed Mafia associates Louis "Louie Eggs" Consalvo and Gregory Rago, who together operated a social club on Mott Street and held criminal interests in New York City. The only problem was that, since these two mobsters were based in New York, their profit and activities should have gone to one of the Five Families, in this instance, either the Gambino crime family or the Colombo crime family. Reputed Gambino family captain Nicholas "Little Nick" Corozzo and Colombo family consigliere Vincenzo "Vinny" Aloi were present during the sitdown. The conflict was eventually resolved peacefully when it was ruled the DeCavalcante crime family could no longer "make" members outside of New Jersey and South Philadelphia, which was another area that the DeCavalcantes had traditionally recruited from.

Death 
In 1995, it was reported that Amari was diagnosed with stomach cancer, and could no longer run the family as much as he could before. It was around this time that prominent family captains Vincent Palermo, Girolamo "Jimmy" Palermo (no relation) and Charles "Big Ears" Majuri were promoted into the family ruling panel as street bosses in aide to Amari, who slowly began to die. Amari, the most powerful member of the DeCavalcante crime family at the time, died of stomach cancer aged 52 on June 14, 1997.

Aftermath 
However, after Amari's sudden death, there were three faction leaders who were eager to gain control of the DeCavalcante crime family, as a massive power vacuum was being developed into the crime family. Two attempts on the lives of both Vince Palermo and Charles Majuri were conspired and hatched by one and another, but none of the assassination plots succeeded. The ruling panel kept controlling the DeCavalcante family throughout the 1990s as massive indictments were mounted. These indictments eventually led to Vince Palermo and captain Anthony Rotondo becoming state's evidence.

In popular culture 
A strong resemblance suggests that the fictional character Giacomo "Jackie" Aprile, Sr. of the HBO hit-series The Sopranos, was loosely based on Amari. They both become acting boss of the New Jersey crime family, only to die of cancer and spark a massive power vacuum between rival factions within their crime families.

References

Further reading 

Smith, Greg B. Made Men: The True Rise-and-Fall Story of a New Jersey Mob Family. Berkley Books, 2003. 
Jacobs, James B. Busting the Mob: The United States Vs. Cosa Nostra. New York: NYU Press, 1994. 
Jacobs, James B., Coleen Friel and Robert Radick. Gotham Unbound: How New York City Was Liberated from the Grip of Organized Crime. New York: NYU Press, 1999. 
Goldstock, Ronald, Martin Marcus and II Thacher. Corruption and Racketeering in the New York City Construction Industry: Final Report of the New York State Organized Crime Task Force. New York: NYU Press, 1990. 
United States. Congress. Senate. Committee on the Judiciary. Organized Crime in America: Hearings Before the Committee on the Judiciary, United States Senate. Washington, D.C.: U.S. G.P.O., 1983.

External links 
 "The Mafia in New Jersey" – State of New Jersey Commission of Investigation 1989
 "Crime Family Dealt a Blow, Police Say" by William K. Rashbaum New York Times October 20, 2000
 UNITED STATES OF AMERICA v. RIGGI, John M UNITED STATES COURT OF APPEALS FOR THE THIRD CIRCUIT December 12, 1991, Filed

 

1945 births
1997 deaths
American gangsters of Sicilian descent
DeCavalcante crime family
Gangsters from Newark, New Jersey
People from Elizabeth, New Jersey
People from Ribera, Agrigento
Deaths from stomach cancer
Deaths from cancer in New Jersey